Cooperiidae is a family of nematodes that are one of the most common intestinal parasitic nematodes in cattle in temperate regions.

References 

Rhabditida
Nematode families